Serena Mary Cowdy (born 1980) is an English politician and writer. She lives in Scotland and represents the Scottish National Party (SNP) on Angus Council.

Early life
Serena Cowdy was born in Peterborough in 1980. Her father was an actor and civil servant. Her parents divorced when she was seven and Cowdy was subsequently raised solely by her father in London after her mother remarried. Her grandfather on her mother's side, Andrew King, was an actor. Cowdy is of English and Irish ancestry. 

Cowdy is a graduate of Oxford University, with a degree in Modern History from St Hilda's College.

Career
Cowdy had an early career acting in plays, short films and television adverts before turning to journalism. She worked as a consumer rights and personal finance journalist for various publications, and also covered political issues for The House, the in-house magazine of the houses of Parliament, The Huffington Post, and PoliticsHome. She has a particular interest in nationalism in politics, having studied Irish nationalism at university.

Personal life
In May 2016, questions were raised about expenses claims for hotel accommodation of two Scottish National Party members of the House of Commons, Stewart Hosie and Angus MacNeil, who were reported to have had relationships with Cowdy. Both MPs were reported to the Parliamentary expenses watchdog by a Conservative Party MP over their expenses claims, however, the Parliamentary Commissioner for Standards, Kathryn Hudson, ruled that there was no basis to launch an inquiry into the matter.

Cowdy has been married to Stewart Hosie MP since 2018.

References 

Living people
Alumni of St Hilda's College, Oxford
English political journalists
English bloggers
English actresses
1980 births
People from Peterborough
English people of Irish descent
British women bloggers
21st-century English women